HMS Vindex has been the name of more than one Royal Navy ship;

, a mixed seaplane and landplane carrier acquired in 1915 and sold in 1920 (formerly SS Viking of the Isle of Man Steam Packet)
, a  commissioned in 1943 and sold in 1947

Royal Navy ship names